Justin Blaine Lawler (born December 23, 1994) is an American football outside linebacker who is a free agent. He played college football at SMU.

Early years
Lawler attended Pottsboro High School in Pottsboro, Texas.  He is related to Los Angeles Clippers Hall of Fame commentator Ralph Lawler.

College career
While only ranked as a two-star prospect from Texas, Lawler's first-team all-state selection (124 tackles, 28 tackles for loss, 13 sacks; 44 catches, 719 yards, 11 touchdowns receiving) portended a good career at SMU. The former high school power lifter was ready to play right away, earning time in all 12 games as a true freshman (23 tackles) and getting some time on offense (three-yard touchdown, two-point conversion). Lawler earned the starting job as a sophomore, lining up for every game and leading the Mustangs with 64 tackles, nine for loss while compiling five sacks. His break-out season came in 2016, garnering first-team American Athletic Conference accolades, racking up 65 stops and leading the team with 15 tackles for loss and six sacks. Lawler gained first-team all-conference recognition as a senior, as well, racking up 74 tackles, 15.5 for loss, 9.5 sacks, two forced fumbles, and three blocked kicks for the Mustangs.

Professional career

Los Angeles Rams
Lawler was drafted by the Los Angeles Rams in the seventh round (244th overall) of the 2018 NFL Draft. During his rookie year in 2018, Lawler played in six games and recorded six tackles.

On September 2, 2019, Lawler was placed on injured reserve after undergoing foot surgery.

On September 5, 2020, Lawler was waived/injured during final roster cuts by the Rams, and subsequently reverted to the team's injured reserve list the next day.

On August 31, 2021, Lawler was waived by the Rams and re-signed to the practice squad the next day. Lawler won his first Super Bowl ring when the Rams defeated the Cincinnati Bengals in Super Bowl LVI.

Tennessee Titans
On February 23, 2022, Lawler signed with the Tennessee Titans. He was released on August 22, 2022.

References

External links
SMU Mustangs bio

1994 births
Living people
People from Grayson County, Texas
Players of American football from Texas
American football defensive ends
American football linebackers
SMU Mustangs football players
Los Angeles Rams players
Tennessee Titans players
Ed Block Courage Award recipients